Federico Ferrari (born 15 September 1969) is an Italian philosopher and art critic. He teaches Philosophy of Art at Brera Academy, in Milan, Italy.

Career 
Under the influence of Maurice Blanchot and Jean-Luc Nancy he has published many essays on philosophy, as well as literature. He has written two books with Jean-Luc Nancy: the first on the subject of nude, the second on the iconography of the writer.
More recently, he has been working on the deconstruction of the museum in post-modernity, on the issue of art and/in time and on the ontological status of the image.
In 2011 he theorized the aesthetics of "Arte Essenziale", which manifested itself in the show held at Collezione Maramotti (Reggio Emilia, Italy) and at Frankfurter Kunstverein (Germany). Eugenio Viola writes of Ferrari, "In a time when many continue to lament what they see as the inexorable decline of theory’s role in criticism, "Arte essenziale" (Essential Art), curated by philosopher Federico Ferrari, does its part to placate concerns with an exploration of the ties that link artistic practice and philosophical speculation. The show focuses on the Wesen, or essence, of a work of art—a notion that has always been inextricably linked with a search for the new."

Bibliography 
 La comunità errante. Bataille e l’esperienza comunitaria, Milano, Lanfranchi, 1997 
 Nudità. Per una critica silenziosa, Milano, Lanfranchi, 1999 
 Wolfgang Laib, Venezia, West Zone 1999
 Nus sommes. La peau des images, with Jean-Luc Nancy, Paris, Klincksieck 2002 (Torino, Bollati Boringhieri, 2003; Berlin-Zűrich, Diaphanes 2006). Trans. Anne O'Byrne and Carlie Anglemire as "Being Nude The Skin of Images", New York, Fordham University Press, (2014) 
 Lo spazio critico. Note per una decostruzione dell’istituzione museale, Roma, Sossella, 2004 (with Johannes Cladders, Rosalind Krauss, Federico Nicolao, Hans Ulrich Obrist, Giulio Paolini, Claudio Parmiggiani, Harald Szeemann) 
 La convocazione, with Tomas Maia e Federico Nicolao, Genova, Chorus, 2006
 Costellazioni. Saggi sull'immagine, il tempo e la memoria, Milano, Lanfranchi, 2006 
 Iconographie dell'auteur, with Jean-Luc Nancy, Paris, Galilée 2005 (Roma, Sossella, 2006; Tokyo, Chikuma Shobo 2008) 
 Del contemporaneo. Saggi su arte e tempo, with Jean-Luc Nancy, Georges Didi-Huberman, Nathalie Heinich, Jean-Christophe Bailly, Milano 2007, Pearson Paravia Bruno Mondadori
 Sub specie aeternitatis. Arte ed etica, Reggio Emilia, Diabasis, 2008 
 Il re è nudo. Aristocrazia e anarchia dell'arte, Roma, Sossella, 2011 
 Arte essenziale, Milano, Silvana, 2011 
 L'insieme vuoto. Per una pragmatica dell'immagine, Milano, Johan & Levi, 2013 
 L'anarca, Milano, Mimesis, 2014 
 La fin des fins. Scène en deux actes, with Jean-Luc Nancy, Nantes, Éditions Cécile Defaut, 2015 
 Visioni. Scritti sull'arte, Milano, Lanfranchi, 2016 
 Oscillazioni. Frammenti di un'autobiografia, Milano, SE, 2016

Video lectures 
 Ferrari, Federico. Arte essenziale. Collezione Maramotti. 2011. (Italian)

References 

1969 births
21st-century Italian philosophers
Continental philosophers
Italian art critics
Writers from Milan
Philosophers of art
Living people